Naohide Yamaguchi (山口 尚秀, Yamaguchi Naohide, born 28 October 2000) is a Japanese Paralympic swimmer. He represented Japan at the 2020 Summer Paralympics.

Career
Yamaguchi represented Japan in the men's 100 metre breaststroke SB14 event at the 2020 Summer Paralympics and won a gold medal.

References

2000 births
Living people
People from Imabari, Ehime
Medalists at the World Para Swimming Championships
Paralympic swimmers of Japan
Swimmers at the 2020 Summer Paralympics
Medalists at the 2020 Summer Paralympics
Paralympic gold medalists for Japan
Paralympic medalists in swimming
Sportspeople from Ehime Prefecture
Japanese male breaststroke swimmers
S14-classified Paralympic swimmers
21st-century Japanese people